Beechburn railway station served the hamlet of Low Beechburn, County Durham, England, from 1845 to 1965 on the Stanhope and Tyne Railway.

History 
The station opened in February 1845 by the Bishop Auckland and Weardale Railway. It was situated at the end of Station Road and to the east of Railway Street. To the north was Beechburn Colliery. It closed on 8 March 1965.

References

External links 

Disused railway stations in County Durham
Railway stations opened in 1845
Railway stations closed in 1965
Beeching closures in England
1845 establishments in England
1965 disestablishments in England

Railway stations in Great Britain opened in 1845